Puebla is a Mexican state.

Puebla may also refer to:

In geography

Mexico
 Puebla, Puebla, a city and capital of the state with the same name
 Puebla Municipality, a municipality in the state
 Battle of Puebla took place on 5 May 1862 near the city of Puebla during the French intervention in Mexico. The battle ended in a victory for the Mexican Army against the occupying French forces and is commemorated by Cinco de Mayo.
 Puebla F.C., a professional football club based in the city of Puebla, Mexico
 Puebla metro station, station in Mexico City

Spain

Andalusia
 La Puebla de Cazalla, province of Seville
 La Puebla de los Infantes, province of Seville
 La Puebla del Río, province of Seville
 Puebla de Don Fadrique, province of Granada
 Puebla de Guzmán, province of Huelva

Aragon
 La Puebla de Alfindén, province of Zaragoza
 La Puebla de Castro, province of Huesca
 La Puebla de Híjar, province of Teruel
 La Puebla de Valverde, province of Teruel
 Puebla de Albortón, province of Zaragoza

Castile and León
 La Puebla de Arganzón, province of Burgos
 La Puebla de los Infantes, province of Segovia
 La Puebla de Valdavia, province of Palencia
 Puebla de Azaba, province of Salamanca
 Puebla de Lillo, province of León
 Puebla de Pedraza, province of Segovia
 Puebla de San Medel, province of Salamanca
 Puebla de Sanabria, province of Zamora
 Puebla de Yeltes, province of Salamanca

Castilla-La Mancha
 La Puebla de Almoradiel, province of Toledo
 La Puebla de Montalbán, province of Toledo
 Puebla de Almenara, province of Cuenca
 Puebla de Beleña, province of Guadalajara
 Puebla de Don Rodrigo, province of Ciudad Real
 Puebla de Valles, province of Guadalajara
 Puebla del Príncipe, province of Ciudad Real
 Puebla del Salvador, province of Cuenca

Extremadura
 Puebla de Alcocer, province of Badajoz
 Puebla de la Calzada, province of Badajoz
 Puebla de la Reina, province of Badajoz
 Puebla de Obando, province of Badajoz
 Puebla de Sancho Pérez, province of Badajoz
 Puebla del Maestre, province of Badajoz
 Puebla del Prior, province of Badajoz

Community of Madrid
 Puebla de la Sierra

Valencian Community
 Puebla de Arenoso, province of Castellón
 Puebla de San Miguel, province of Valencia

United States
 La Puebla, New Mexico, a census-designated place (CDP) in Santa Fe County, New Mexico, United States

In biology
 Puebla (moth), a moth genus

Surname
 Carlos Puebla (1917–1989), a Cuban singer, guitarist, and composer.
 Teté Puebla (b. 1940), a former Cuban guerilla fighter